Behesht-e Zahra (lit. The Paradise of Zahra, from Fatima az-Zahra) is the largest cemetery in Iran. Located in the southern part of metropolitan Tehran, it is connected to the city by Tehran Metro Line 1.

History
In the early 1950s, all the cemeteries in Tehran were supposed to be replaced by several large new ones outside the then precincts of the capital.  Behesht-e Zahra was built in late 1960s on the southern side of Tehran towards the direction of the city of Qom and opened on 29 June 1970 by mayor of Tehran, Gholamreza Nikpey. It was named by Ayatollah Ahmad Khonsari. The first person buried in Behesht-e Zahra was Mohammad-Taghi Khial on 25 July 1970.

Many of the deceased soldiers of the Iran–Iraq War were buried in the martyr's section of the graveyard.

Notable burials

Royalties
 Prince Abdol-Ali Mirzā Farmānfarmāian (1935–1973) – industrialist and nobleman
 Badr-ol-Molouk Vālā (1895–1979) – wife of Ahmad Shah Qajar
 Princess Ezzosaltaneh Qājār (fa) (1891–1984) – daughter of Nasser al-Din Shah Qajar
 Princess Irāndokht Qājār (1915–1984) – daughter of Ahmad Shah Qajar
 Princess Sadigheh Pahlavi (fa) (1916–1990) – daughter of Reza Shah
 Prince Hamid-Rezā Pahlavi (1932–1992) – youngest son of Reza Shah
 Esmat Dowlatshāhi (1904–1995) – Reza Shah's wife

Politicians (Pahlavi Era)
 Mozaffar A'lam (1882–1973) – politician
 Shamseddin Amir-Alaei (1900–1994) – diplomat and politician
 Ahmad Ārāmesh (fa) (1908–1973) – minister of labour (1946–47)
 Abdolrahmān Farāmarzi (1897–1972) – politician
 Saeid Mālek Loqmān ol-Molk (fa) (1888–1972) – minister of health (1944–48) and senator
 Hossein Navāb (1897–1972) – minister of foreign affairs (1952)
 Mohammad Sā'ed Sā'ed ol-Vozarā (1883–1973) – prime minister of Iran (1944) and (1948–50)
 Rezā Tajaddod (fa) (1888–1974) – politician
 Abdolqadir Āzād (fa) (1891–1974) – politician
 Aligholi Hedāyat (fa) (1898–1974) – senator
 Mohammad-Ali Keshavārz Sadr Bahādor ol-Molk (1902–1974) – politician
 Sādegh Rezāzādeh Shafagh (fa) (1895–1971) – politician and scholar
 Hājar Tarbiat (fa) (1906–1974) – senator
 Nāser Āmeri (fa) (1928–1975) – politician
 Mohammad-Ali Dādvar (fa) (1903–1977) – politician
 Ahmad Bahādori (fa) (1911–1977) – senator
 Jahānshāh Samsām (fa) (1911–1977) – senator
 Mahmoud Jalili (fa) (1912–1977) – senator
 Amir-Abbās Hoveydā (1919–1979) – prime minister of Iran (1965–77) and leader of Rastakhiz party
 Mahmoud Jafariān (1928–1979) – director-general of National Iranian Radio and Television (NIRT)
 Gholāmhossein Dāneshi (fa) (1936–1979) – politician
 Parviz Nikkhāh (1939–1979) – politician
 Sālār Jāff (fa) (1940–1979) – politician
 Najafgholi Moezzi Hesām od-Dowleh (fa) (1886–1980) – politician
 Habibollāh Amouzgār (fa) (1890–1980) – minister of education (1951) and senator
 Ahmad Ali Sepehr (1889–1976) – politician and historian
 Abolqāsem Najm (1892–1980) – minister of foreign affairs (1945–46)
 Nasrollāh Entezām (1900–1980) – diplomat
 Farrokhroo Pārsā (1922–1980) – minister of education (1968–71)
 Anoushirvān Sepahbodi (1888–1981) – diplomat and minister of foreign affairs (1947)
 Javād Āmeri (fa) (1891–1981) – politician
 Allāh-Yār Sāleh (1897–1981) – diplomat and politician
 Abdolbāghi Shoāei (fa) (1903–1982) – minister of finance (1960–62)
 Mehdi Mashāyekhi (fa) (1905–1985) – mayor of Tehran (1945–46)
 Abbās Ārām (1906–1985) – minister of foreign affairs (1959–66)
 Shams Qanatābādi (fa) (1914–1987) – politician
 Amir-Teymour Kalāli (1894–1988) – minister of interior (1949–51)
 Ebrāhim Fakhrāei (fa) (1899–1988) – politician
 Zeynolābedin Rahnamā (fa) (1890–1989) – politician
 Mohammad Ali Varasteh (1896–1989) – politician
 Hossein Jodat (fa) (1892–1990) – politician
 Kāzem Hassibi (1906–1990) – politician
 Abbāsqoli Golshāyān (fa) (1902–1990) – minister of finance (1948–50)
 Mehdi Āzar (1901–1994) – minister of education (1952–53)
 Ahmad Hooman (1909–1995) (fa) – minister of imperial court (1951)
 Azizollāh Malek-Esmāili (fa) (1903–1996) – politician
 Jahanshah Saleh (1905–1977) – physician and politician
 Jalāl Abdoh (de) (1909–1996) – diplomat
 Nosratollāh Kāsemi (fa) (1911–1996) – politician
 Hossein-Ali Rāshed (fa) (1905–1980) – politician
 Parvin Soufi (fa) (d. 1997) – politician
 Vajihollāh Fāzel (fa) (1907–1998) – senator
 Gholāmali Farivar – minister of industries and mines (1961)
 Shams-ol-Molouk Mosāheb (1922–1998) – senator
 Abolfazl Ghāzi (fa) (1931–1998) – minister of higher education (1978)
 Mehrangiz Manouchehriān (1906–2000) – lawyer and senator
 Hassan Shālchiān (fa) (1911–2000) – minister of roads and transportation
 Javād Sadr (fa) (1912–2000) – minister of interior (1963–66)
 Abolghāsem Tafazzoli (fa) (1921–2004) – politician
 Sabār Farmānfarmāiān (1912–2006) – minister of health (1953)
 Amir-Nosratollāh Bālākhānlou (1917–2007) – politician
 Mohammad-Ali Safi-Asfiā (fa) (1913–2008) – chief of Planning and Budget Organization (1962–68)
 Kāzem Oskouei (fa) (1919–2009) – politician
 Mohammad-Rezā Jalāli Nāeini (fa) (1916–2010) – senator
 Masoud Borzin (fa) (1920–2010) – director-general of NIRT
 Hassan-Ali Sāremi Kalāli (fa) (1926–2011) – politician
 Manouchehr Āgah (fa) (1930–2012) – politician
 Yahyā Sādeq Vaziri (fa) (1911–2013) – minister of justice (1979)
 Rahim Zehtābfar (fa) (1927–2013) – politician
 Rezā Kermāni (fa) (1934–2013) – politician
 Manouchehr Saeid Vaziri (fa) (1920–2014) – politician
 Hossein Falsafi (fa) (1919–2015) – politician
 Karim Motamedi (fa) (1924–2018) – minister of communications (1974–79)

Military personnel
 Mohammad-Ali Vājed Sālār Motazed (fa) (1886–1975) – IIA general
 Rezā Zandipour (fa) (1923–1975) – IIA general
 Ahmad Mogharebi (de) (1921–1977) – IIA general
 Marzieh Arfaei (fa) (1901–1978) – physician and IIA general
 Nematollāh Nassiri (1910–1979) – Imperial Iranian Army (IIA) general and head of SAVAK (1965–78)
 Jafarqoli Sadri (fa) (1911–1979) – head of National Police
 Mehdi Rahimi (1921–1979) – IIA general
 Rezā Nāji (fa) (1923–1979) – IIA general
 Manouchehr Khosrowdād (1927–1979) – Imperial Iranian Army Aviation general
 Nāder Jahānbāni (1928–1979) – Imperial Iranian Air Force (IIAF) general
 Amir-Hossein Rabiei (1931–1979) – commander in chief of IIAF (1977–79)
 Houshang Hātam (fa) (1918–1980) – IIA general
 Ali Eghbāli Dogāhe (1949–1980) – IIAF pilot
 Farrokhzād Jahāngiri (fa) (1950–1980) – IIAF pilot
 Ahmad Keshvari (1953–1980) – IRIA pilot
 Houshang Vahid Dastjerdi (fa) (1925–1981) – head of National Police
 Valiollāh Fallāhi (1931–1981) – chief of staff of Islamic Republic of Iran Army (IRIA)
 Javād Fakoori (1938–1981) – chief of staff of Islamic Republic of Iran Air Force (IRIAF)
 Hemmatollāh Pahlavān (fa) (1906–1982) – IIA general
 Mahmoud Mirjalāli (fa) (1898–1983) – IIA general
 Mir-Mohammad Mohannā (fa) (1901–1983) – commander in chief of IIAF (1948–49)
 Hedayatollah Gilanshah (1907–1986) – commander in chief of IIAF
 Hassan Aghāreb Parast (1946–1984) – IRIA general
 Masoud Monfared Niāki (1929–1985) – IRIA general
 Hassan Ābshenāsān (1936–1985) – IRIA general
 Hossein Khalatbari (1949–1985) – IRIAF pilot
 Abdolbāghi Darvish (1948–1986) – IRIAF pilot
 Hossein Fardoust (1917–1987) – IIA general and deputy head of SAVAK
 Mohammad-Ali Saffāri (fa) (1898–1988) – head of National Police and senator
 Bahrām Hooshyār (1938–1991) – IRIAF pilot
 Mansour Sattāri (1948–1995) – chief of staff of IRIAF
 Alireza Yasini (fa) (1951–1995) – IRIAF pilot
 Ali Sayād Shirāzi (1944–1999) – chief of staff of IRIA
 Qāsem-Ali Zahirnejād (1924–1999) – chief of staff of IRIA
 Jalil Zandi (1951–2001) – IRIAF ace fighter pilot
 Mohammad-Hādi Shādmehr (1920–2008) – chief of staff of IRIA
 Gholāmrezā Ghāsemi (fa) (1930–2012) – IRIA general
 Mortezā Bāyandariān (fa) (1940–2012) – IRIA general
 Siābakhsh Nassiri Zibā (fa) (1935–2013) – IRIA general
 Mohammad-Hossein Moeinpour (1934–2014) – chief of staff of IRIAF (1981-83)
 Asghar Imāniān (1929–2015) – chief of staff of IRIAF (1979)
 Abolfath Yāftābādi (fa) (1930–2015) – IRIAF general
 Mohammad Salimi (1937–2016) – chief of staff of IRIA
 Behrouz Soleimānjāh (fa) (1938–2016) – IRIA general
 Mohsen Gheytāslou (1990–2016) – member of IRIA Special Forces
 Ali Razmi (fa) (1933–2017) – IRIA general
 Ali-Akbar Mousavi Ghavidel (fa) (1937–2017) – IRIA general
 Cyrus Lotfi (fa) (1935–2018) – IRIA general
 Dāriush Zarghāmi (fa) (1940–2018) – IRIN commando
 Nāsser Farbod (1922–2019) – chief of staff of IRIA (1979)
 Houshang Seddigh (1941–2020) – chief of staff of IRIAF (1983-86)
 Samad Bālāzādeh (fa) (1953–2020) – IRIAF pilot
 Manouchehr Mohagheghi (fa) (1943–2021) – IRIAF pilot

Political dissidents
 Ali-Akbar Safāei Farāhāni (fa) (1939–1971) – Marxist activist and a founder of Organization of Iranian People's Fedai Guerrillas (OIPFG)
 Behrouz Dehqāni (fa) (1939–1971) – Marxist activist
 Ali-Rezā Nābdel (1944–1971) – Marxist activist
 Saeid Mohsen (fa) (1939–1972) – Marxist activist and a founder of People's Mujahedin of Iran (PMOI)
 Mohammad Hanifnejād (fa) (1940–1972) – Marxist activist and a founder of PMOI
 Ali-Asghar Badiezādegān (fa) (1940–1972) – Marxist activist and a founder of PMOI
 Masoud Ahmadzādeh (1945–1972) – Marxist activist
 Mehdi Rezāei (fa) (1952–1972) – Marxist activist
 Khosrow Golsorkhi (1944–1974) – Marxist activist and member of Tudeh Party
 Marzieh Ahmadi (1945–1974) – Marxist activist
 Shirin Moāzed (fa) (1945–1974) – Marxist activist
 Kerāmatollāh Dāneshiān (1944–1974) – Marxist activist
 Bijan Jazani (1938–1975) – Marxist activist and a founder of OIPFG
 Hassan Ziā-Zarifi (1939–1975) – Marxist activist
 Majid Sharif Vāghefi (1948–1975) – Marxist activist
 Mohammad Nakhshab (fa) (1923–1976) – founder of Movement of God-Worshipping Socialists
 Mostafā Shoāeiān (ru) (1936–1976) – Marxist activist
 Hamid Ashraf (1946–1976) – Marxist activist and a founder of OIPFG
 Rezā Ostād-Hassan-Bannā (fa) (1922–1978) – protester
 Ali Andarzgoo (fa) (1937–1978) – Islamist activist
 Kāmrān Nejātollāhi (fa) (1953–1978) – scholar
 Ali Shāyegān (1901–1981) – member of the National Front
 Ebrāhim Karimābādi (1917–1981) – member of the National Front
 Karim Keshāvarz (fa) (1900–1986) – member of Tudeh Party
 Mozzafar Baghāei (1911–1987) – leader of Toilers Party of the Iranian Nation
 Ehsān Tabari (1917–1989) – member of Tudeh Party
 Ali-Akbar Saeidi Sirjāni (1931–1994) – journalist
 Ahmad Zirakzādeh (1907–1993) – member of the National Front
 Abolfazl Qāsemi (1921–1993) – member of the National Front
 Homā Dārābi (1940–1994) – pediatrician
 Ebrāhim Zālzādeh (1948–1997) – author
 Dāriush Forouhar (1928–1998) – founder of Nation Party of Iran
 Parvāneh Forouhar (1938–1998) – politician
 Majid Sharif (1950–1998) – journalist
 Hossein Makki (1911–1999) – member of the National Front
 Noureddin Kiānouri (1915–1999) – Marxist activist and general secretary of Tudeh Party
 Ali Ardalān (1914–2000) – politician and member of the National Front
 Asghar Pārsā (1919–2007) – member of the National Front
 Parviz Varjāvand (1934–2007) – scholar and member of the National Front
 Zahrā Bani-Yaghoub (1980–2007) – physician
 Majid Kāvousifar (1979–2007) – assassin
 Maryam Firouz (1914–2008) – communist member of Tudeh party
 Ali Mousavi (1966–2009) – protester
 Omid-Rezā Mirsayāfi (1980–2009) – blogger
 Neda Āghā-Soltān (1983–2009) – protester
 Rāmin Pourandarjāni (1983–2009) – physician
 Mostafā Karimbeigi (1983–2009) – protester
 Mohsen Rouholamini (1984–2009) – protester
 Sohrāb A'rābi (1990–2009) – protester
 Abdoulrezā Soudbakhsh (1950–2010) – physician
 Siāmak Pourzand (1931–2011) – journalist
 Hodā Sāber (1959–2011) – journalist
 Mohammad Mokhtāri (1989–2011) – protester
 Farideh Māshini (1960–2012) – feminist
 Mohsen Amiraslāni (1977–2014) – psychoanalyst
 Farshid Hakki (1974–2018) – political activist
 Ali-Rezā Shir-Mohammad-Ali (1998–2019) – political activist
 Niktā Esfandāni (fa) (2005–2019) – protester
 Mohammad Maleki (1933–2020) – member of the National Front
 Ruhollāh Zam (1978–2020) – journalist
 Khosrow Seif (fa) (1934–2021) – member of the National Front
 Mohsen Shekāri (1999–2022) – protester
 Sadaf Movahedi (fa) (2003–2022) – protester
 Yaldā Āghāfazli (fa) (2003–2022) – protester

Politicians (Islamic Republic)
 Mahmoud Tāleghāni (1911–1979) – cleric and a founder of Freedom Movement of Iran
 Asghar Vesāli (1950–1980) – member of IRGC
 Mohammad-Hossein Fahmideh (1967–1980) – war hero
 Hassan Lāhouti (fa) (1927–1981) – politician
 Mohammad Beheshti (1928–1981) – chief justice of Iran (1979–81) and head of Islamic Republic Party (IRP)
 Mostafā Chamrān (1932–1981) – minister of defence
 Mohammad-Javād Bāhonar (1933–1981) – prime minister of Iran (1981)
 Mohammad-Ali Rajāei (1933–1981) – prime minister (1980–81) and president of Iran (1981)
 Mohammad-Ali Fayyāzbakhsh (fa) (1937–1981) – politician
 Mousā Nāmjoo (1938–1981) – minister of defence
 Hassan Āyat (1938–1981) – member of IRP
 Hassan Abbāspour (1944–1981) – minister of energy
 Mohammad Montazeri (1944–1981) – cleric
 Mahmoud Ghandi (1945–1981) – minister of communication
 Yousef Kolāhdouz (1946–1981) – member of IRGC
 Hassan Azodi (fa) (1946–1981) – politician
 Mousā Kalāntari (1949–1981) – minister of housing (1980–81)
 Mohammad Kachouei (fa) (1950–1981) – warden of Evin Prison
 Mohammad Jahānārā (fa) (1954–1981) – member of Islamic Revolutionary Guard Corps (IRGC)
 Mohsen Vezvāei (1960–1982) – member of IRGC
 Mohammad Boroujerdi (1955–1983) – member of IRGC
 Hassan Bāgheri (fa) (1956–1983) – member of IRGC
 Mehdi Shāhābādi (fa) (1930–1984) – member of Majles
 Mohammad-Ebrāhim Hemmat (1955–1984) – member of IRGC
 Mojtabā Hāshemi (de) (1940–1985) – head of Islamic Revolution Committees
 Mahmoud Kāveh (1961–1986) – member of IRGC
 Kāzem Sāmi (1935–1988) – minister of health (1979)
 Ruhollāh Khomeini (1902–1989) – cleric and supreme leader of the Islamic Republic of Iran (1979–1989)
 Asadollāh Mobāsheri (1909–1990) – minister of justice
 Mohammad-Javād Tondguyān (1938–1991) – minister of petroleum
 Mortezā Āvini (1947–1993) – war photographer
 Ahmad Khomeini (1945–1995) – cleric and politician
 Asadollāh Lājevardi (1935–1998) – warden of Evin Prison
 Seifollāh Vahid Dastjerdi (1926–1999) – head of Iranian Red Crescent Society
 Saied Emāmi (1958–1999) – deputy minister of intelligence
 Ali-Akbar Aboutorābi-Fard (1939–2000) – member of Majles
 Hossein Āyatollāhi (1931–2001) – cleric
 Taghi Ebtekār (fa) (1932–2001) – head of department of environment (1979–80)
 Rahmān Dādmān (1956–2001) – minister of roads and transportation
 Habibollāh Dāvarān (fa) (1926–2003) – politician
 Mohsen Nourbakhsh (1948–2003) – governor of the Central Bank
 Mohammad Abāei Khorāsāni (1940–2004) – cleric
 Rezā Zavāre'i (1938–2005) – politician
 Masoud Ahmadi Moghaddasi (1963–2005) – judge
 Nematollāh Sālehi Najafābādi (1923–2006) – cleric
 Taghi Khāmoushi (1937–2006) – politician
 Serājeddin Kāzerouni (fa) (1947–2006) – minister of housing (1984–93)
 Jamāl Karimi-Rād (1956–2006) – minister of justice
 Ahmad Kāzemi (1958–2006) – member of IRGC
 Fakhreddin Hejāzi (1929–2007) – member of Majles
 Bahāeddin Adab (1945–2007) – member of Majles
 Mohammad-Rezā Tavassoli (1931–2008) – cleric
 Ahmad Bourghāni (1959–2008) – member of Majles
 Khadijeh Saqafi (1913–2009) – Khomeini's wife
 Ali Golzādeh Ghafouri (1923–2010) – cleric
 Abbās-Ali Amid Zanjāni (1937–2011) – cleric
 Hassan Tehrāni-Moghaddam (1959–2011) – member of IRGC
 Maryam Behrouzi (1945–2012) – member of Majles
 Hassan Habibi (1937–2013) – vice president
 Habibollāh Asgarolādi (1932–2013) – minister of commerce (1981–83)
 Hamid Taqavi (1955–2014) – member of IRGC
 Mostafā Dāvoudi (fa) (1939–2015) – chairman of National Sports Organisation (1981–83)
 Sādeq Tabātabāei (1943–2015) – deputy prime minister (1979)
 Hossein Hamadāni (1950–2015) – member of IRGC
 Gholāmhossein Shokouhi (fa) (1926–2016) – minister of education (1979)
 Mostafā Katirāei (1928–2016) – minister of housing (1979)
 Hossein Shāh-Hosseini (1928–2017) –  chairman of Physical Education Organization (1979)
 Jafar Shojouni (1932–2016) – cleric
 Marzieh Hadidchi (1939–2016) – member of Majles
 Akbar Hāshemi Rafsanjāni (1934–2017) – president of Iran (1989–1997)
 Ali Shariatmadāri (1924–2017) – minister of culture (1979)
 Ebrāhim Yazdi (1931–2017) – minister of foreign affairs (1979)
 Dāvoud Ahmadinejād (1950–2017) – politician
 Shahlā Habibi (1958–2017) – politician
 Ali-Akbar Moeinfar (1928–2018) – minister of petroleum (1979)
 Abbās Amir-Entezām (1932–2018) – deputy prime minister (1979)
 Mohammad Bastenegār (1941–2018) – politician
 Abbās Duzduzāni (1942–2018) – minister of culture (1980–81)
 Asadollāh Asgarolādi (1933–2019) – businessman
 Azam Tāleghāni (1943–2019) – member of Majles
 Mohammad-Nabi Habibi (1945–2019) – mayor of Tehran (1984–87)
 Mohammad Ahmadiān (1956–2019) – politician
 Ahad Gudarziāni (1969–2019) – journalist
 Mohammad Kiāvash (1930–2020) – member of Majles
 Gholām-Abbās Tavassoli (1935–2020) – politician
 Mousā Zargar (fa) (1935–2020) – minister of health (1979–80)
 Mohammad Mirmohammadi (1949–2020) – member of Expediency Discernment Council
 Hossein Sheikholeslām (1952–2020) – politician
 Hossein Kāzempour Ardebili (1952–2020) – politician
 Mohammad-Rezā Rāhchamani (1952–2020) – member of Majles
 Nāsser Shabāni (1952–2020) – member of IRGC
 Ali-Asghar Zārei (1956–2020) – member of IRGC
 Hassan Zāre Dehnavi (1956–2020) – prosecutor
 Hamid Kahrām (1958–2020) – member of Majles
 Fātemeh Rahbar (1964–2020) – member of Majles
 Mohammad-Rezā Najafi (1969–2020) – member of Majles
 Mohammad-Hādi Nejādhosseiniān (fa) (1946–2021) – minister of industries (1989–94)
 Hassan Tarighat Monfared (1946–2021) – minister of health (2012–13)
 Akbar Torkān (1952–2021) – minister of roads and transportation (1989–93)
 Nāder Shariatmadāri (1960–2021) – politician
 Mohammad-Rezā Madhi (1969–2021) – member of IRGC
 Ali Tehrāni (1926–2022) – cleric
 Abbās Sheibāni (1931–2022) – politician
 Mortezā Mohammadkhān (1946–2022) – minister of commerce (1993–97)
 Esmāil Jabbārzādeh (1960–2022) – member of Majles
 Rostam Ghāsemi (1964–2022) – minister of petroleum (2011–13)
 Hassan Sayyād Khodāei (1972–2022) – member of IRGC

Scholars and journalists
 Abbas Khalili (1895–1972) – journalist, diplomat
 Abdolhossein Sanatizādeh (fa) (1895–1973) – novelist
 Hushang Irāni (1925–1973) – poet
 Mohammad Hejāzi (1900–1974) – writer
 Ahmad-Ali Sepehr (fa) (1888–1975) – historian
 Mojtabā Minovi (1903–1976) – scholar
 Abdolhossein Mirsepāsi (fa) (1907–1976) – scholar
 Mohsen Hashtroodi (1908–1976) – scholar
 Masih Dāneshvari (fa) (1899–1977) – scholar
 Isā Sedigh (1894–1978) – scholar and founder of the University of Tehran
 Mohammad Parvin Gonābādi (1903–1978) – scholar
 Gholāmhossein Mosāheb (1910–1979) – scholar
 Hassan Amid (1910–1979) – lexicographer
 Khadijeh Afzal Vaziri (1889–1981) – journalist
 Isā Behnām (fa) (1906–1984) – scholar
 Enāyatollāh Shakibāpour (fa) (1907–1984) – translator
 Habib Nafisi (1908–1984) – scholar and founder of the Tehran Polytechnic
 Āzar Andāmi (1926–1984) – physician
 Bahrām Sādeghi (1937–1984) – writer
 Zabihollāh Mansouri (fa) (1899–1986) – translator
 Noor-ol-Hodā Mangeneh (1902–1986) – author
 Hassan Sajjādinejād (fa) (1918–1988) – scholar
 Ganjali Sabāhi (1906–1989) – writer
 Firouz Shirvānlou (fa) (1938–1989) – scholar
 Abbās Nalbandiān (1949–1989) – playwright
 Ali-Akbar Siāssi (1896–1990) – scholar and politician
 Parviz Nātel Khānlari (1914–1990) – linguist and scholar
 Mehrdād Avestā (1930–1991) – poet
 Abolghāsem Hālat (fa) (1914–1992) – writer
 Bahrām Farahvashi (fa) (1925–1992) – scholar
 Ahmad Fardid (1909–1994) – philosopher
 Mehrdād Bahār (1930–1994) – linguist
 Esfandiār Esfandiāri (es) (1910–1995) – scholar
 Mohammad-Javād Mashkour (fa) (1918–1995) – scholar
 Abbās Zaryāb (1919–1995) – scholar
 Mohammad-Taqi Dāneshpajouh (1911–1996) – scholar
 Karim Fakoor (fa) (1926–1996) – poet
 Khānbābā Bayāni (fa) (1909–1997) – scholar and founder of the University of Azarabadegan
 Ahmad Tafazzoli (1937–1997) – scholar
 Ahmad Ārām (fa) (1904–1998) – scholar
 Hamid Mosadegh (1940–1998) – poet
 Mahmoud Sāremi (1968–1998) – journalist
 Nasrollāh Khādem (fa) (1910–1999) – scholar
 Mortezā Rāvandi (fa) (1913–1999) – scholar
 Jafar Shahri (fa) (1914–1999) – ethnographer
 Abdolhossein Zarrinkoob (1923–1999) – scholar
 Abdollāh Sheibāni (fa) (1903–2000) – scholar
 Mahmoud Mosāheb (fa) (1912–2000) – scholar
 Abbās Sahāb (1921–2000) – scholar
 Parviz Shāpour (1924–2000) – writer and satirist
 Bijan Jalāli (1927–2000) – poet
 Fereydoun Moshiri (1926–2000) – poet
 Parviz Dāriush (fa) (1922–2001) – poet
 Yahyā Zokā (fa) (1923–2001) – scholar
 Amir-Hossein Āryānpour (1925–2001) – lexicographer
 Gholāmhossein Āhani (fa) (1927–2001) – scholar
 Ahmad Birashk (fa) (1907–2002) – scholar
 Yahyā Adl (1908–2002) – physician
 Cherāgh-Ali Azami (fa) (1924–2002) – scholar
 Mostafā Rahimi (fa) (1926–2002) – scholar
 Khosrow Shāhāni (fa) (1929–2002) – writer
 Rezā Beykzādeh (1946–2002) – journalist
 Farrokh Tamimi (fa) (1933–2002) – poet
 Iraj Bastāmi (1957–2003) – poet
 Abdolhossein Navāei (fa) (1924–2004) – scholar
 Kioumars Sāberi Foumani (1941–2004) – satirist
 Hassan Hosseini (sr) (1956–2004) – poet
 Zeinolābedin Motamen (ru) (1914–2005) – scholar
 Shāhrokh Meskoob (1924–2005) – scholar
 Esmāil Navvāb-Safā (fa) (1925–2005) – poet
 Fazlollāh Akbari (fa) (1925–2005) – scholar
 Parviz Atābaki (fa) (1928–2005) – author
 Karim Emāmi (1930–2005) – translator
 Mahmoud Mosharraf Āzād Tehrāni (1933–2006) – poet
 Nowzar Parang (fa) (1937–2006) – poet
 Iraj Zand (fa) (1950–2006) – sculptor
 Houshang A'lam (fa) (1928–2007) – scholar
 Nāser Malekniā (1931–2007) – scholar
 Mehdi Ghālibāfiān (1935–2007) – scholar
 Bāgher Āyatollāhzādeh Shirāzi (fa) (1936–2007) – scholar
 Akbar Rādi (1939–2007) – playwright
 Ali-Mortezā Samsām Bakhtiāri (1945–2007) – scholar
 Fereydoun Ādamiyat (1920–2008) – historian
 Ahmad Ghahremān (1928–2008) – scholar
 Tāhereh Saffārzādeh (1936–2008) – writer
 Nāder Ebrāhimi (1936–2008) – writer
 Masoud Āzarnoush (1945–2008) – archaeologist
 Mehrān Ghāssemi (1977–2008) – journalist
 Rozā Montazemi (1921–2009) – author
 Mohammad-Amin Riāhi (1923–2009) – scholar
 Abolghāssem Masoudi (fa) (1930–2009) – journalist
 Bijan Taraghi (fa) (1930–2009) – poet
 Esmāil Fasih (fa) (1935–2009) – writer
 Mohammad-Nabi Sarbolouki (1944–2009) – scholar
 Enāyatollāh Rezā (1920–2010) – scholar
 Ali-Naghi Monzavi (de) (1923–2010) – scholar
 Seifollāh Kāmbakhsh-Fard (1929–2010) – scholar
 Rahim Rezāzādeh Malek (fa) (1940–2010) – scholar
 Shokouh Mirfattāh (1946–2010) – scholar
 Azizollāh Bayāt (fa) (1920–2011) – scholar
 Iraj Afshār (1925–2011) – bibliographer and historian
 Jahānshāh Derakhshāni (fa) (1944–2011) – scholar
 Manouchehr Vesāl (fa) (1913–2012) – scholar
 Simin Dāneshvar (1921–2012) – scholar and novelist
 Ghamar Āriyān (1922–2012) – scholar
 Ehsāan Narāghi (1926–2012) – scholar
 Parviz Rajabi (fa) (1939–2012) – scholar
 Habibollāh Hedāyat (1920–2013) – scholar
 Abdolmohammad Āyati (1926–2013) – scholar
 Bāqer Āqeli (fa) (1929–2013) – scholar
 Parvāneh Vossough (1936–2013) – physician and entrepreneur
 Mortezā Sāghebfar (fa) (1942–2013) – scholar
 Amir-Hossein Fardi (1949–2013) – writer
 Fahimeh Rahimi (fr) (1952–2013) – writer
 Mohammad-Ebrāhim Bāstāni Pārizi (1924–2014) – historian
 Simin Behbahāni (1927–2014) – poet
 Nāser Kātouziān (1931–2014) – scholar
 Mahmoud Tolouei (fa) (1930–2015) – historian
 Mohammad-Ali Sepānlou (1940–2015) – poet
 Nāser Pourpirār (1940–2015) – writer
 Hassan Tavanāyān-Fard (1943–2015) – scholar
 Shahriār Adl (de) (1944–2015) – archaeologist
 Mortezā Sohrābi (fa) (1946–2015) – scholar
 Hamid Golpirā  (1960–2015) – journalist
 Dāvoud Pārsāpajouh  (1941–2015) – scholar
 Amir Ashiri (fa) (1925–2016) – writer
 Abolhassan Najafi (1929–2016) – scholar
 Houshang Mahdavi (fa) (1930–2016) – writer
 Hassan Farsām (1932–2016) – scholar
 Poorān Farrokhzād (1933–2016) – writer
 Abbās Shafiei (1937–2016) – scholar
 Ghāsem Hāsheminejād (1940–2016) – poet
 Atāollāh Behmanesh (1923–2017) – journalist
 Habibollāh Chāichiān (1923–2017) – poet
 Hossein Tofigh (fa) (1929–2017) – journalist
 Ali-Rezā Yaldā (1930–2017) – scholar
 Mohsen Ghānebasiri (1949–2017) – scholar
 Mediā Kāshigar (1956–2017) – writer
 Dāriush Shāyegan (1935–2018) – philosopher
 Gholāmhossein Sadri Afshār (fa) (1935–2018) – scholar
 Salim Neisāri (1920–2019) – scholar
 Yadollāh Samareh (1932–2019) – scholar
 Mohsen Abolghāsemi (fa) (1932–2019) – scholar
 Bahman Keshāvarz (fa) (1944–2019) – scholar
 Abbāsgholi Dāneshvar (fa) (1925–2020) – scholar
 Hassan Tofigh (fa) (1926–2020) – journalist
 Badrozzamān Gharib (fa) (1929–2020) – scholar
 Ahmad Niktalab (1934–2020) – poet
 Sādegh Malek Shahmirzādi (1940–2020) – scholar
 Fariborz Raisdānā (1945–2020) – scholar
 Akbar Ālemi (fa) (1945–2020) – scholar
 Gholāmrezā Sahāb (fa) (1948–2020) – scholar
 Massoud Mehrābi (1954–2020) – journalist
 Mahlaghā Mallāh (1917–2021) – scholar
 Jalāl Sattāri (1931–2021) – scholar
 Mohammad-Rezā Bāteni (1935–2021) – scholar
 Āzartāsh Āzarnoush (1938–2021) – scholar
 Hamid-Rezā Sadr (1956–2021) – journalist
 Moslem Bahādori (1927–2022) – scholar
 Nāder Tālebzādeh (1953–2022) – journalist
 Rezā Roostā Āzād (1962–2022) – scholar
 Alirezā Ashrafi (1964–2023) – scholar

Artists
 Faramarz Taghavi (1953–2022) – hairdresser
 Dāvoud Pirniā (fa) (1900–1971) – musician
 Saeid Hormozi (1897–1976) – musician
 Majid Vafādār (fa) (1913–1976) – musician
 Afshin Moghadam (1945–1976) – singer
 Mohammad-Ali Amir-Jāhed (fa) (1896–1977) – musician
 Hossein Nāsehi (1925–1977) – musician
 Abolhassan Etesāmi (1903–1978) – architect
 Ali-Naqi Vaziri (1886–1979) – musician
 Javād Badizādeh (fa) (1902–1979) – musician
 Gholāmali Ravānbakhsh (fa) (1935–1979) – singer
 Esmāil Adib Khānsāri (1901–1982) – musician
 Faramarz Pilaram (1937–1983) – painter
 Hossein Gol-e-Golāb (1895–1984) – poet and musician
 Mahmoud Mahmoudi Khānsāri (fa) (1934–1987) – singer
 Amanollāh Tājik (fa) (1937–1987) – singer
 Maryam Rouhparvar (fa) (1932–1988) – singer
 Ahmad Ebādi (1906–1993) – musician
 Javād Maroufi (1912–1993) – musician
 Abolhassan Sadighi (1894–1995) – painter and sculptor
 Rassām Arabzādeh (fa) (1914–1995) – carpet designer
 Heshmat Sanjari (1918–1995) – composer and conductor
 Hossein Sarshār (de) (1934–1995) – singer and actor
 Giti Pāshāei (1940–1995) – singer
 Changiz Shahvagh (fa) (1933–1996) – painter and sculptor
 Naser Farhangfar (fr) (1947–1997) – musician
 Jalil Ziāpour (1920–1999) – painter
 Molouk Zarrābi (eo) (1907–2000) – singer
 Jafar Pourhāshemi (fa) (1928–2001) – musician
 Jahāngir Malek (fa) (1933–2002) – musician
 Asadollāh Malek (fa) (1941–2002) – musician
 Hossein Lorzādeh (1906–2004) – architect
 Mortezā Varzi (1922–2004) – musician
 Delkash (1924–2004) – singer
 Hadi Āmeri (1913–2005) – composer and conductor
 Jafar Petgar (fa) (1920–2005) – painter
 Fereydoun Nāseri (fa) (1930–2005) – conductor
 Mojtabā Mirzādeh (1945–2005) – musician
 Ali-Akbar Sanati (ru) (1916–2006) – painter and sculptor
 Ali Tajvidi (1919–2006) – musician
 Hadi Mirmirān (1945–2006) – architect
 Bābak Bayāt (fa) (1946–2006) – musician
 Omrān Salāhi (fa) (1946–2006) – writer
 Fākhereh Sabā (1920–2007) – opera singer
 Hamid Ghanbari (fa) (1924–2007) – singer
 Parviz Yāhaghi (1936–2007) – composer
 Parivash Sotoudeh (fa) (d. 2007) – singer
 Ghorbān Soleimāni (1920–2008) – musician and vocalist
 Abbās Kātouzian (1923–2008) – painter and artist
 Khātereh Parvāneh (1929–2008) – singer
 Nikol Faridani (1935–2008) – photographer
 Shusha Guppy (1935–2008) – writer, editor and singer
 Jāzeh Tabātabāi (1938–2008) – painter
 Nāmi Petgar (fa) (1945–2008) – painter
 Mohammad-Amin Mirfenderski (fa) (1931–2009) – architect
 Farāmarz Pāyvar (1933–2009) – musician
 Hassan Shojāei (fa) (1941–2009) – singer
 Mehdi Sahābi (1944–2009) – painter and sculptor
 Abdi Yamini (fa) (1953–2009) – musician
 Parviz Meshkātiān (1955–2009) – musician
 Mohammad Nouri (1929–2010) – singer
 Bahman Jalāli (1944–2010) – photographer
 Farmān Behboud (1946–2010) – musician
 Masoud Houshmand (fa) (1946–2010) – songwriter
 Āndre Ārzoumāniān (Անդրե Արզումանյան) (fa) (1954–2010) – musician
 Mahmoud Javādipour (de) (1920–2012) – painter
 Mansoureh Hosseini (1926–2012) – artist
 Behrouz Ahmadi (fa) (1946–2012) – architect
 Jalil Shahnāz (1921–2013) – musician
 Ghāsem Jebeli (fa) (1927–2013) – singer
 Dāriush Safvat (1928–2013) – musician
 Homāyoun Khorram (1930–2013) – musician
 Mortezā Pāshāei (1984–2014) – singer
 Mansour Narimān (1935–2015) – musician
 Nimā Petgar (fa) (1947–2015) – painter
 Javād Lashkari (fa) (1923–2016) – musician
 Asghar Bichāreh (1927–2016) – photographer
 Farhang Sharif (1931–2016) – musician
 Ali-Akbar Tajvidi (1927–2017) – painter
 Nāder Golchin (fa) (1936–2017) – singer
 Hāmed Hākān (fa) (1984–2017) – singer
 Nāser Cheshmāzar (1950–2018) – musician
 Shirin Aliābādi (1973–2018) – artist
 Hossein Dehlavi (1927–2019) – composer
 Masoud Arabshāhi (1935–2019) – painter
 Farhād Ebrāhimi (1935–2019) – songwriter
 Mehrbānou Salāmi (fa) (1935–2019) – singer
 Hossein Zamarshidi (fa) (1939–2019) – architect
 Fereydoun Sadighi (fa) (1936–2020) – sculptor
 Houshang Zarif (1938–2020) – musician
 Farhād Ahmadi (fa) (1951–2020) – architect
 Abdolvahāb Shahidi (1922–2021) – singer
 Kāmbiz Derambakhsh (1942–2021) – cartoonist
 Yadollāh Maftun Amini (1926–2022) – poet
 Habibollāh Sādeghi (ru) (1951–2022) – painter

Actors, actresses and film directors
 Mahmoud Johari (fa) (1945–1976) – actor
 Ebrāhim Morādi (fa) (1907–1977) – film director
 Akbar Meshkin (fa) (1925–1977) – actor
 Samad Sabāhi (fa) (1914–1978) – actor
 Parviz Fanizādeh (1937–1979) – actor
 Khosrow Haritāsh (1932–1980) – film director
 Esmāil Koushān (1917–1981) – film director
 Habibollāh Bolour (fa) (1913–1982) – actor and wrestler
 Mohammad-Taqi Kahnamouei (fa) (1920–1983) – actor
 Esmāil Poursaeid (fa) (1926–1983) – film director
 Abbās Mosaddegh (fa) (1926–1984) – actor
 Moezz-Divan Fekri (fa) (1900–1985) – actor and film director
 Khānbābā Motazedi (1892–1986) – film photographer
 Ātash Khayyer (fa) (1952–1986) – actress
 Esmāil Mohammadi (fa) (1910–1987) – actor
 Sāber Ātashin (fa) (1926–1987) – actor
 Roshanak Sadr (fa) (1959–1987) – actress
 Sādegh Bahrāmi (fa) (1909–1988) – actor
 Ezzatollāh Moghbeli (fa) (1933–1988) – actor
 Mohsen Badie (fa) (1908–1989) – film director
 Mahmoud Lotfi (fa) (1926–1989) – actor
 Ezzatollāh Vosough (fa) (1914–1991) – actor
 Houshang Beheshti (fa) (1923–1991) – actor
 Parviz Khatibi (fa) (1923–1993) – film director
 Siāmak Yāsemi (1925–1994) – film director
 Farhang Mehrparvar (fa) (1946–1994) – actor
 Ali Sajjādi Hosseini (1953–1994) – film director
 Roghieh Chehreh-Āzād (fa) (1907–1995) – actress
 Irān Daftari (fa) (1907–1996) – actress
 Gholamhossein Naghshineh (1908–1996) – actor
 Valiollāh Khākdān (1923–1996) – art director
 Jalāl Moghaddam (fa) (1929–1996) – film director
 Manouchehr Hāmedi (fa) (1939–1996) – actor
 Ali Hātami (1944–1996) – film director
 Rouhangiz Sāminejād (1916–1997) – actress
 Jahāngir Forouhar (1916–1997) – actor
 Ali Tābesh (fa) (1925–1997) – actor
 Fereshteh Jenābi (1948–1998) – actress
 Gholamhossein Bahmanyār (fa) (1927–1999) – actor
 Rouhollāh Emāmi (de) (1940–1999) – film editor
 Ahmad Najibzādeh (fa) (1940–1999) – screenwriter
 Ali-Asghar Garmsiri (fa) (1911–2000) – actor
 Nematollāh Gorji (1926–2000) – actor
 Mohammad-Ali Fardin (1930–2000) – actor and wrestler
 Firouz Behjat Mohammadi (fa) (1936–2000) – actor
 Roubik Mansouri (Ռուբիկ Մանսուրի) (fa) (1937–2000) – film editor
 Mahin Deyhim (fa) (1925–2001) – actress
 Jamileh Sheykhi (1930–2001) – actress
 Jamshid Mehrdād (fa) (1932–2001) – actor
 Mansour Vālāmaqām (fa) (1936–2001) – actor
 Kanaān Kiāni (fa) (1932–2002) – actor
 Parvin Malakouti (fa) (1938–2002) – actress
 Jamshid Esmāilkhāni (fa) (1950–2002) – actor
 Rezā Jiān (fa) (1949–2003) – actor
 Mehdi Fathi (1939–2004) – actor
 Mostafā Oskouei (1924–2005) – film director
 Manouchehr Nowzari (fa) (1936–2005) – actor
 Mohsen Ārāsteh (fa) (1937–2005) – actor
 Fereydoun Goleh (1942–2005) – film director
 Ali Zāhedi (fa) (1949–2005) – actor
 Bitā Tavakkoli (fa) (1994–2005) – child actress
 Jafar Bozorgi (fa) (1917–2006) – actor
 Ahmad Ghadakchiān (1920–2006) – actor
 Abdolali Homāyoun (fa) (1920–2006) – actor
 Hossein Kasbiān (fa) (1934–2006) – actor
 Soroush Khalili (fa) (1937–2006) – actor
 Vākhtāng Nersi Korkiā (fa) (1938–2006) – actor
 Hamid Rakhshāni (fa) (1951–2006) – film editor
 Poopak Goldarreh (1971–2006) – actress
 Garshā Raoufi (fa) (1933–2007) – actor
 Rasoul Mollāgholipour (1955–2007) – film director
 Esmāil Dāvarfar (1932–2008) – actor
 Khosrow Shakibāei (1944–2008) – actor
 Ahmad Āqālou (fa) (1949–2008) – actor
 Abbās Sakhāei (1953–2008) – actor and photographer
 Dāvoud Asadi (fa) (1969–2008) – actor
 Mehri Mehrniā (fa) (1917–2009) – actress
 Parvin Soleimāni (1922–2009) – actress
 Farrokh-Laghā Houshmand (fa) (1929–2009) – actress
 Abbās Shabāviz (fa) (1929–2009) – actor
 Jamshid Lāyegh (fa) (1931–2009) – actor
 Ali Miri (fa) (1936–2009) – actor
 Amir Ghavidel (fa) (1947–2009) – film director
 Seifollāh Dād (1955–2009) – film director
 Masoud Rassām (fa) (1957–2009) – film director
 Peymān Abadi (1972–2009) – stuntman
 Nikou Kheradmand (1932–2009) – actress
 Esmāil Riāhi (fa) (1920–2010) – film director
 Hamideh Kheirābādi (1924–2010) – actress
 Mahin Shahābi (fa) (1936–2010) – actress
 Mahmoud Bahrāmi (fa) (1937–2010) – actor
 Rezā Karam-Rezāei (fa) (1937–2010) – actor
 Nemat Haghighi (fa) (1939–2010) – film director
 Mohammad Varshowchi (fa) (1925–2011) – actor
 Mehri Vedādiān (fa) (1936–2011) – actress
 Mohsen Yousefbeig (fa) (1940–2011) – actor
 Esfandiār Ahmadieh (1929–2012) – film director
 Hamid Samandariān (1931–2012) – theater director
 Shāpour Gharib (1933–2012) – film director
 Abdollāh Boutimār (fa) (1933–2012) – actor
 Touti Salimi (fa) (1954–2012) – actress
 Taghi Rouhāni (1920–2013) – news anchor
 Saadi Afshār (fa) (1934–2013) – actor
 Jahāngir Jahāngiri (fa) (1946–2013) – film director
 Asal Badiei (1977–2013) – actress
 Mortezā Ahmadi (1924–2014) – actor
 Hassan Raziāni (fa) (1931–2014) – actor
 Māziār Partow (1933–2014) – film director
 Nāser Gitijāh (fa) (1935–2014) – actor
 Anoushirvān Arjmand (1941–2014) – actor
 Bāgher Sahrāroudi (fa) (1942–2014) – actor
 Akhtar Karimi Zand (fa) (1928–2015) – actress
 Valiollāh Momeni (1943–2015) – actor
 Homā Roustā (1944–2015) – actress
 Iraj Karimi (fr) (1953–2015) – film director
 Mostafā Abdollāhi (1955–2015) – actor
 Ali Tabātabāei (1983–2015) – actor
 Parviz Shāhinkhoo (fa) (1915–2016) – actor
 Dāvoud Rashidi (1933–2016) – actor
 Jafar Vāli (fa) (1934–2016) – actor
 Mohammad Zarrindast (1934–2016) – film director
 Forouzān (1937–2016) – actress
 Sorayyā Beheshti (fa) (1951–2016) – actress
 Donyā Fanizādeh (1967–2016) – puppeteer
 Ali Rāmez (fa) (1927–2017) – actor
 Mohammad Poursattār (1939–2017) – actor
 Kāzem Afrandniā (1945–2017) – actor
 Ali Moallem (fa) (1962–2017) – film critic
 Hassan Joharchi (1968–2017) – actor
 Nāser Malek-Motiei (1930–2018) – actor
 Iraj Safdari (1939–2018) – make-up artist
 Ezzatolāh Entezāmi (1924–2018) – actor
 Hossein Erfāni (1942–2018) – voice actor
 Hossein Shahāb (fa) (1947–2018) – actor
 Yadollāh Samadi (1951–2018) – film director
 Karim Zargar (fa) (1953–2018) – actor
 Saeid Kangarāni (1954–2018) – actor
 Dāriush Asadzādeh (fa) (1923–2019) – actor
 Nosrat Karimi (1924–2019) – actor
 Shahlā Riāhi (1927–2019) – actress
 Rezā Abdi (fa) (1931–2019) – actor
 Jamshid Mashāyekhi (1934–2019) – actor
 Ebrāhim Ābādi (1934–2019) – actor
 Rezā Safāei (fa) (1936–2019) – film director
 Zobeideh Jahāngiri (fa) (1942–2019) – actress
 Farrokh Sājedi (fa) (1942–2019) – actor
 Habib Kāvosh (fa) (1944–2019) – film director
 Hamid Soheili (fa) (1949–2019) – film director
 Hossein Moheb-Ahari (fa) (1951–2019) – actor
 Khashāyār Alvand (fa) (1967–2019) – screenwriter
 Ali-Asghar Shahbāzi (1922–2020) – actor
 Nosratollāh Vahdat (1925–2020) – actor
 Mohammad-Ali Keshāvarz (1930–2020) – actor
 Valiollāh Shirandāmi (fa) (1931–2020) – actor
 Sedigheh Kiānfar (1932–2020) – actress
 Malakeh Ranjbar (fa) (1936–2020) – actress
 Ahmad Pourmokhber (fa) (1940–2020) – actor
 Khosrow Sināei (1941–2020) – film director
 Parviz Poorhosseini (1941–2020) – actor
 Bahman Mofid (1942–2020) – actor
 Cyrus Gorjestāni (fa) (1945–2020) – actor
 Nouri Kasrāei (fa) (1951–2020) – actress
 Karim Akbari Mobārakeh (1953–2020) – actor
 Siāmak Shāyeghi (1954–2020) – film director
 Kāmboziā Partovi (1955–2020) – film director
 Ali Abolhassani (fa) (1972–2020) – actor
 Siāmak Atlasi (1936–2021) – actor
 Hamid Mojtahedi (1942–2021) – film producer
 Fathali Oveisi (1946–2021) – actor
 Fereshteh Tāerpour (1953–2021) – film producer
 Bābak Khorramdin (1974–2021) – film director
 Arshā Aghdasi (fa) (1982–2021) – stuntman
 Āzādeh Nāmdāri (1984–2021) – actress
 Jalāl Maghāmi (fa) (1941–2022) – actor
 Amin Tārokh (1954–2022) – actor

Athletes
 Shervin Jazāyeri (fa) (1954–1972) – mountain climber
 Karam Nirlou (1943–1976) – football player
 Mehdi Masoud-Ansāri (d. 1978) – football player
 Ali Dānāeifard (1921–1979) – football player
 Mansour Raeisi (1928–1980) – wrestler
 Hossein Sadaghiāni (1903–1982) – football player and coach
 Esmāil Elmkhāh (1936–1988) – weight-lifter
 Mahmoud Nāmjoo (1918–1990) – weight-lifter
 Hossein Soroudi (d. 1991) – football player
 Parviz Dehdāri (1935–1992) – football player and coach
 Mehrāb Shāhrokhi (1944–1993) – football player
 Akbar Khojini (1935–1995) – boxer
 Ahmad Izadpanāh (fa) (1910–1997) – athlete
 Hossein Jabbārzādegān (d. 1997) – basketball player
 Ezatollāh Jānmaleki (1947–1999) – football player
 Jafar Salmāsi (1918–2000) – weight-lifter and first Iranian Olympic medallist
 Abbās Ekrāmi (1915–2002) – football manager
 Mohammad Pazirāei (1929–2002) – wrestler
 Nabi Sorouri (1933–2002) – wrestler
 Hossein Fekri (1924–2003) – football player
 Yousef Safvat  (1931–2003) – chess player
 Khosrow Kahyāi (fa) (1940–2003) – chess player
 Mohammad Ranjbar (1935–2004) – football player
 Shamseddin Seyed-Abbāsi (1943–2004) – wrestler
 Fereydoun Sādeghi (d. 2005) – basketball player
 Nāser Kārfarsā (fa) (1923–2005) – football player
 Firouz Alizādeh (1946–2005) – wrestler
 Majid Sabzi (fa) (1959–2006) – football player
 Hossein-Ali Mobasher (fa) (1922–2007) – football player
 Sādegh Aliakbarzādeh (1932–2007) – boxer
 Hamid Shirzādegān (1941–2007) – football player
 Tourān Shādpour (fa) (1951–2007) – athlete
 Āidin Nikkhāh Bahrāmi (1982–2007) – basketball player
 Aboutāleb Tālebi (1945–2008) – wrestler
 Fariborz Morādi (1964–2008) – football player
 Abbās Gharib (1916–2009) – football player
 Amir-Hossein Mobāsher (fa) (1922–2009) – football player
 Nāser Āghāei (1944–2009) – boxer
 Māshāllāh Amin-Sorour (1931–2010) – cyclist
 Mostafā Tājik (1932–2010) – wrestler
 Mansour Amirāsefi (1933–2010) – football player
 Kāmboziā Jamāli (1938–2010) – football player
 Masoud Boroumand (1928–2011) – football player
 Nāser Hejāzi (1949–2011) – football player
 Masoud Estili (1969–2011) – football player
 Leilā Esfandiāri (1970–2011) – mountain climber
 Abdollāh Mojtabavi (1925–2012) – wrestler
 Jalāl Mansouri (1930–2012) – wrestler
 Dāvoud Nasiri (fa) (1921–2013) – football player
 Hassan Sadiān (1925–2013) – wrestler
 Javād Derafshi-Javān (fa) (1927–2013) – tennis player
 Boyuk Jeddikār (1929–2013) – football player
 Nosratollāh Momtahen (1930–2013) – sports shooter
 Akbar Poudeh (1933–2012) – cyclist
 Hassan Pākandām (1934–2013) – boxer
 Nāzem Ganjāpour (1943–2013) – football player
 Mohammad-Hassan Zolfaghāri (d. 2013) – basketball player
 Kāzem Sārikhāni (1978–2013) – judoka
 Gholāmhossein Mazloumi (1950–2014) – football player
 Hossein Maadani (1971–2014) – volleyball player
 Rasoul Raeisi (1924–2015) – weightlifter
 Āref Gholizādeh (1938–2015) – football player
 Kāmbiz Derafshi-Javān (fa) (1954–2015) – tennis player
 Homāyoun Behzādi (1942–2016) – football player
 Mansour Pourheidari (1946–2016) – football player
 Rezā Ahadi (1962–2016) – football player
 Bahman Golbārnejād (1968–2016) – cyclist
 Hossein Soudipour (1922–2017) – basketball player
 Abbās Zandi (1930–2017) – wrestler
 Nāser Givehchi (1932–2017) – wrestler
 Manouchehr Boroumand (1934–2017) – weightlifter
 Bijan Zarnegār (1940–2017) – fencer
 Ebrāhim Āshtiāni (1941–2017) – football player
 Akbar Eftekhāri (1943–2017) – football player
 Mohammad-Ali Falāhatinejād (1976–2017) – weightlifter
 Ghorbān-Ali Tāri (fa) (1927–2018) – football player
 Ali-Rezā Ghelichkhāni (1937–2018) – wrestler
 Mahmoud Moezzipour (fa) (1937–2018) – wrestler
 Iraj Dānāeifard (1951–2018) – football player
 Majid Gholāmnejād (1983–2018) – football player
 Amir Āghā-Hosseini (fa) (1931–2019) – football player
 Nadjmeddin Fārābi (1933–2019) – athlete
 Abdollāh Khodābandeh (1936–2019) – wrestler
 Parviz Jalāyer (1939–2019) – weightlifter
 Jafar Kāshāni (1944–2019) – football player
 Khosrow Harandi (1950–2019) – chess player
 Keyvān Vahdāni (1991–2019) – football player
 Abolfazl Salabi (1924–2020) – basketball player
 Amir Yāvari (1931–2020) – boxer
 Mohammad Āmi-Tehrāni (1938–2020) – weightlifter
 Fariborz Esmāili (1940–2020) – football player
 Parviz Aboutāleb (1942–2020) – football player
 Mohammad-Rezā Navāei (1948–2020) – wrestler
 Sabā Shāyesteh (fa) (1990–2020) – rower
 Hamid Jāsemiān (1936–2021) – football player
 Mehdi Attār-Ashrafi (1948–2021) – weightlifter
 Abbās Ansārifard (1956–2021) – football administrator
 Kāzem Mohammadi (1973–2021) – futsal player
 Mehrdād Mināvand (1975–2021) – football player
 Ali Ansāriān (1977–2021) – football player
 Shāhpour Zarnegār (1929–2022) – fencer
 Hossein Ghafourizādeh (1943–2022) – athlete
 Ahmad Akbari (1947–2022) – fencer

Businessmen and philanthropists
 Mohammad-Ali Mofarrah (fa) (1915–1983) – businessman and founder of Bank Saderat Iran
 Gholāmali Abidi (fa) (1920–2004) – scholar and businessman
 Mohammad-Taghi Barkhordār (1924–2012) – businessman
 Ahmad Atāei (fa) (1919–2013) – philanthropist
 Fereydoun Novin Farahbakhsh (fa) (1930–2013) – businessman and collector
 Mahāfarid Amir-Khosravi (1969–2014) – businessman
 Abdorrahim Jafari (fa) (1919–2015) – philanthropist
 Rezā Niāzmand (fa) (1921–2017) – philanthropist
 Asghar Ghandchi (1928–2019) – philanthropist

Others
 Sakineh Ghāsemi (d. 1979) – sex worker
 Majid Sālek Mohammadi (d. 1985) – serial killer
 Effat Tejāratchi (1917–1999) – pioneer aviator
 Bozorg "Moody" Mahmoody (1939–2009) – anaesthesiologist
 Shahlā Jāhed (1969–2010) – convict
 Reyhāneh Jabbāri (1988–2014) – convict

In addition to tombs of the royals, politicians, and other significant people, in the graveyard there are symbolic tombs for the perpetrators of the 1983 Hezbollah attacks on the U.S. Marine and French peacekeepers' barracks in Beirut and for the assassin of Anwar Sadat, Khalid Islambouli. Similarly, a symbolic tomb was erected in the cemetery for Hezbollah member Imad Mughniyah, who was killed on 12 February 2008 in Damascus, Syria.

Images

See also
 Mausoleum of Ruhollah Khomeini
 Khavaran cemetery
 Zahir-od-dowleh cemetery

References

 
1970 establishments in Iran
Shia cemeteries
Cemeteries in Tehran
National cemeteries
Cemeteries established in the 1970s